Habershonia is a monotypic moth genus of the family Erebidae described by Nye in 1975. Its only species, Habershonia areos, was first described by Pieter Cramer in 1777. It is found in the Virgin Islands.

References

Calpinae
Monotypic moth genera